Dato' Larry Tey Por Yee (born 2 February 1976, in Kuala Lumpur) is a Malaysian businessman and venture capitalist.

He is the CEO and founder of Nexgram Group, a conglomerate and investment company in businesses including telecom, property and information technology industries with presence in Malaysia, Indonesia, Thailand and China.

Early life 

Tey earned a Bachelor of Commerce degree, majoring in Business Administration and Finance from University of Manitoba. Tey invested in various startup companies in North America and Canada, before returning to Malaysia where he joined a corporate advisory company.

Business 

Larry joined business advisory firm Global Capital Limited, in 2008 to focus on investment and merger and acquisition dealings in emerging markets, especially Asia Pacific with special interest in technology, infrastructure and energy companies.

In 2015 Dato' Larry Tey Por Yee joined Gomif Partners, a niche investment network focus on incubating social business startups. Gomif Partners focus on investment in sustainable humanity business ventures, including artificial intelligence, robotics and internet Software as a Service (SaaS) business models.

Nexgram Group

Dato' Tey Por Yee founded Nexgram Group in 1999. Under his leadership, the company developed businesses that include telecommunication, property development, information technology, infrastructure and manufacturing services. The company also owns and operates one of the largest surveillance and security company in Malaysia known as Sensorlink.

Other Investments

Larry private investment includes private companies and public listed companies, such as Asdion Bhd, Iretex Bhd, and Wintoni Group Bhd.

Awards and recognition
 In 2013 Focus Malaysia Journal, listed him in the ’40 CEOs under 40’ list.

Honours
  :
  Knight Companion of the Order of the Crown of Pahang (DIMP) – Dato' (2014)

References

External links
 Tey Por Yee Shareholder of Nexgram (The Wall Street Journal)
 Tey makes waves in small-cap companies
 Tey Por Yee ups stake in Ire-Tex
 Winsun Technologies to have new CEO soon?
 A moment of money: 40 CEO in Malaysia 
 Asdion Bhd Announces Ownership Interest Of Tey Por Yee
 Gamuda Bhd Announces Ownership Interest Of Tey Por Yee
 Nexgram, Angkasa bangunkan hartanah
 Angkasa to take up two Nexgram property projects for RM1.44b
 Nexgram Land eyes RM293m net profit via projects

1976 births
Living people
Malaysian people of Hokkien descent
Malaysian people of Chinese descent
Malaysian businesspeople